Robert Stein may refer to:

 Bob Stein (American football) (born 1948), American football linebacker
 Bobby Stein (died 2021), Scottish footballer for Raith Rovers, Montrose, and East Stirlingshire
 Robert Stein (computer pioneer) (born 1946), American computer pioneer and electronic publisher
 Robert Stein (explorer) (1857–1917), Prussian-American Arctic explorer
 Robert Stein Jr., comptroller for the Coalition Provisional Authority in Iraq, convicted of fraud
 Robert Stein, Scottish developer of the "patent still"
 Robert Stein (born 8/31/1963), American Podiatric Physician
 Robert A. Stein (law professor) (born 1939), American law school dean and American Bar Association president
 Robert A. Stein (diplomat) (1919–1998), American diplomat
 Robert F. Stein, American physicist and astronomer, see Timeline of solar astronomy
 Bobby Van (Robert Jack Stein, 1928–1980), American musical actor
 R. L. Stine (Robert Lawrence Stein, born 1943), best-selling American author of the horror-fiction genre
 Rob Stein (1943–2022), American political strategist
 Robert M. Stein (born 1950), American political scientist
 Róbert Stein (-2018), Hungarian businessman, "the father of Hungarian video game development"

See also
 Robert Stein Wines, New South Wales, Australia
 Stein (surname)
 Robert Steiner (disambiguation)